The 1914 United States Senate election in Oklahoma took place on November 3, 1914. Incumbent Senator Thomas Gore, a Democrat, sought re-election in his first popular election. He was challenged by Republican nominee John H. Burford, a former Justice on the Territorial Oklahoma Supreme Court; Socialist nominee Patrick S. Nargle, a former U.S. Marshal; and Progressive nominee William O. Cromwell, the former State Attorney General. Despite the fact that the left-leaning vote was split several ways in the election, Gore won re-election in a landslide, receiving 48% of the vote to Burford's 29,  Nagle's 21%, and Cromwell's 2%.

Democratic primary

Candidates
 Thomas Gore, incumbent U.S. Senator
 Samuel W. Hayes, former Chief Justice of the Oklahoma Supreme Court

Results

Republican primary

Candidates
 John H. Burford, former Justice on the Territorial Oklahoma Supreme Court

Results

Socialist Primary

Candidates
 Patrick S. Nagle, former U.S. Marshal

Results

Progressive primary

Candidates
 William O. Cromwell, former Oklahoma Attorney General

Results

General election

Results

References

Oklahoma
1914
1914 Oklahoma elections